Yaghmurasen Ibn Zyan (1206 – February/March 1283, long name: Yaghmurasan ben Ziyan ben Thabet ben Mohamed ben Zegraz ben Tiddugues ben Taaullah ben Ali ben Abd al-Qasem ben Abd al-Wad) was the founder of the Zayyanid dynasty. Under his reign the Zayyanid Kingdom of Tlemcen extended over present-day north-western Algeria.

Life 
He was of the Zenata Berber tribe. He founded the Zayyanid state in 1235, and warred with the Almohad Caliphate until 1248. He was successful in his military campaigns against the Merinids and the Maqil Arab tribe.

The governor of Ceuta, Abou'l-Hassan ben-Khelas, had revolted against the Almohads and recognised the sovereignty of Yaghmurasen, after this the Almohad ruler decided to march against Tlemcen but was defeated by Yaghmurasen. When the Almohad Caliph marched against him, Yaghmurasen defeated him in the Battle of Oujda, the Almohad Caliphs head was taken and ordered to be shown to his mother.

Ibn Khaldun mentions anecdotes about him. Thus Yaghomracen heard genealogists who traced his descent from Muhammad. He commented about this claim in his local Berber language and said this:

When an architect wanted to write his name on a minaret that he had built, Yaghmurasen replied in his Zenati dialect "God knows" (Issen Rebbi).

Name
In his commentary on the hagiographic book of Ibn al-Zayyat al-Tadili (Attashawof), Ahmed Toufiq explains that Yaghmur in Berber means "the virile/Stallion" whereas the prefix asen means "to them". Thereby giving "Yaghmurasen" a meaning close to "To prevail over them"

See also
Zayyanid dynasty

References

Zyan 01
Zyan 01
Zenata
1206 births
1283 deaths
People from Tlemcen
13th-century Berber people
13th-century monarchs in Africa